Solomon Harper (born in Poplar Grove, Arkansas, on August 8, 1893) was an inventor known for creating the first electrically heated hair roller and 28 other inventions. During the course of his career, he struggled to receive recognition and compensation for his inventions. Harper was trained as an electrical engineer and was a veteran. He was a politically active communist, and organized at least one march to picket the White House about unemployment in 1930.

References

1893 births
Year of death missing
Place of death missing
20th-century American inventorswent to howard ]] 
20th-century American engineers
American electrical engineers
Engineers from Arkansas
People from Phillips County, Arkansas
African-American engineers
African-American inventors
20th-century African-American people